The Presbyterian Church in Singapore (Abbreviation: PCS) is a Presbyterian Reformed church. The current moderator is the Rt Rev Keith Lai.

The denomination motto is "Nec tamen consumebatur" which means "Yet it was not consumed".

History 
In 1965, Singapore became independent from Malaysia. The Presbyterian Church in Singapore held its first Synod in January 1975. Two language presbyteries, English and Chinese, were formed. The church also runs several schools.

Founding and development 
The church's origin can be traced back to the London Missionary Society. In 1829, the Rev Benjamin Keasberry came to Malaysia and Singapore, and started Prinsep Street Presbyterian Church in 1843. In 1856, Scottish residents established Orchard Road Presbyterian Church, and in 1881 the English Presbyterian Missionary Society under the leadership of John Cook, established a Chinese church called Glory Presbyterian Church.

Three other churches were organised in 1883: Prinsep Street Life Church, Tanjong Pagar Church and Upper Serangoon Road Bethel Church. In 1903, the Upper Serangoon Road Bethel Church was combined with Tekka Church (now Life Bible-Presbyterian Church) and Bukit Timah Church (now Glory Presbyterian Church) as Siah Tek Church with the Rev Lin Xi appointed as the pastor. In 1999, the name of the church was changed from The Chinese Christian Church Bethel Congregation to Bethel Presbyterian Church.

In 1901, the Synod of the Presbyterian Church was formed. The name was changed to Presbyterian Church in Singapore and Malaysia in 1968. In 1975, following the separation of Singapore and Malaysia and in view of political geographical and church administrative factors, the Synod was formally separated into the Presbyterian Church in Malaysia and the Presbyterian Church in Singapore. The first AGM was convened that year and the first Moderator was Rev Stephen Tan.

In 1993, with the increase of English churches, the Chinese Presbytery and English Presbytery were formed. The Church grew rapidly and 2001, a combined worship service was held to celebrate her 120th anniversary in the setting up of churches. In 2003, the Singapore Presbyterian Foundation was formed.

Doctrine 
The Presbyterian Church in Singapore acknowledges the Apostles Creed and Westminster Confession of Faith. It believes in the Father, the Son and Holy Spirit. The Church believes that Jesus Christ is the Head of the Church. All powers and functions of the Church are subject to Christ's authority.

Statistics 
The Presbyterian Church in Singapore has 21,000 members in 37 congregations. It has one Synod and two Presbyteries, the English Presbytery and the Chinese Presbytery.

Interchurch relations 
The church is a member of the World Communion of Reformed Churches and the Council for World Missions. Sister church relations with the Presbyterian Church (USA), Church of Scotland, and the Presbyterian churches in Australia and New Zealand were established.

Schools 

 Kuo Chuan Presbyterian Primary School
 Pei Hwa Presbyterian Primary School
 Kuo Chuan Presbyterian Secondary School
 Presbyterian High School

References

External links 

Official Church website

Presbyterianism in Singapore
Members of the World Communion of Reformed Churches
Presbyterian denominations in Asia
Christian organizations established in 1975
Singapore